Evanescence is an American rock band.

Evanescence may also refer to:
 an abstract noun expressing the notion of ephemerality
 Evanescence (Evanescence album), 2011
 Evanescence, a 1998 EP by Evanescence
 Evanescence (Maria Schneider album), 1994
 Evanescence (Scorn album), 1994
 Evanesce (album), by Anatomy of a Ghost, 2003
 Evanescent field

See also 
 Evanescent (disambiguation)
 "Evanescence", term used by Commander Whitehead instead of effervescence